SM UB-39 was a German Type UB II submarine or U-boat in the German Imperial Navy during World War I.

Design
A German Type UB II submarine, UB-39 had a displacement of  when at the surface and  while submerged. The submarine was powered by two Körting six-cylinder diesel engines producing a total , two Siemens-Schuckert electric motors producing , and one propeller shaft.

UB-39 was fitted with two  torpedo tubes, four torpedoes, and one  Uk L/30 deck gun. She had a complement of twenty-one crew members and two officers and a 42-second dive time.

Construction and career
The U-boat was ordered on 22 July 1915 and launched on 28 December 1915. She was commissioned into the German Imperial Navy on 29 April 1916 as SM UB-38.

The submarine sank 93 ships in 14 patrols. UB-39 struck a mine and sank in the English Channel on 17 May 1917.

Summary of raiding history

References

Notes

Citations

Bibliography 

 

1915 ships
Ships built in Hamburg
World War I submarines of Germany
German Type UB II submarines
U-boats commissioned in 1916
Maritime incidents in 1917
U-boats sunk in 1917
U-boats sunk by mines
World War I shipwrecks in the English Channel
Ships lost with all hands